Wolfeton House (sometimes Wolveton House) is an early Tudor and Elizabethan manor house in Dorset, England. It is situated amongst water-meadows north-west of Dorchester not far from the confluence of the rivers Frome and Cerne.  It is near to the village of Charminster.

History
The compact original courtyard section of the current building dates back to about 1480.  Possibly dating back to Roman times, the house has been the country seat of several families, including the Mohuns and Trenchards.  The surviving building was built by the Trenchard family, one of the most prominent families in Dorset during the 16th century. In January 1506 Sir Thomas Trenchard entertained in Wolfeton/Wolveton Philip of Austria, Archduke of Austria, King of Castile, and his wife Queen Joanna of Castile, after their ship, en route to Spain, was brought to English shores at Melcombe Regis by storm, close to Wolfeton. Concerning this chance event, the famous story about John Russell, 1st Earl of Bedford, who having been born the son of a Weymouth wine importer, became a favoured courtier of King Henry VIII, is told by the Dorset historian John Hutchins (d.1773) as follows: In this house John Russell of Berwick (Dorset), Esq, laid the foundation of the honours and fortunes of the illustrious family of the Duke of Bedford. Having resided some years in Spain, he was sent for by his relation Sir Thomas Trenchard to attend and entertain the Archduke of Austria, King of Castile, who recommended him to the favour of King Henry VII who took him into favour and appointed him one of the gentlemen of his privy chamber and afterwards recommended him to his son Henry VIII.

Building
Parts of Wolfeton House date back to the south side of an early quadrangular courtyard house, dating from the 16th century. The house has a three floored tower on the south side, with the topmost stage build in approximately 1862. West of the tower the wall was built in 16th century and  leads to the octagonal garderobe tower.

Inside the house is oak panelled and includes an extensive collection of Elizabethan and Jacobean carvings, including those of Roman Soldiers and a figure of a Briton brandishing a club. The main staircase of stone is believed to be unique, built in 1580 with carved figures in the balustrade. The Great Chamber's floor is original and dates to the 16th century, whilst the fireplace is carved with figures including a Native American.

Gatehouse
The gatehouse at Wolfeton House includes an inscription panel stating it was finished in 1534. It has two round towers which are not identical in size, with an entrance archway between, but off-centre. Around the door is a label mould, with two stops, showing a satyr and a woodmouse each holding staves. Above the door is cartouche dating from the early 18th century. It is available for holidays through the Landmark Trust.

References

Further reading 
 
 
Booton, Peter. "Dorset Interiors: Wolfeton House", ''Dorset Magazine

External links

 Historic Houses Association: Wolfeton House – visiting information
 Tour UK: Wolfeton House
 Great Houses & Manors of Dorsetshire
 Landmark Trust

Country houses in Dorset
Historic house museums in Dorset
Grade I listed buildings in Dorset